para-Dimethylaminobenzaldehyde is an organic compound containing amine and aldehyde moieties which is used in Ehrlich's reagent and Kovac's reagent to test for indoles. The carbonyl group typically reacts with the electron rich 2-position of the indole but may also react at the C-3 or N-1 positions.  It may also be used for determination of hydrazine.

Ehrlich's reagent
para-Dimethylaminobenzaldehyde is the main ingredient in Ehrlich's reagent.  It acts as a strong electrophile which reacts with the electron-rich α-carbon (2-position) of indole rings to form a blue-colored adduct. It can be used to detect the presence of indole alkaloids. Not all indole alkaloids give a colored adduct as result of steric hindrance which does not allow the reaction to proceed.

Ehrlich's reagent is also used as a stain in thin layer chromatography and as a reagent to detect urobilinogen in fresh, cool urine.  If a urine sample is left to oxidize in air to form urobilin the reagent will not detect the urobilinogen. By adding few drops of reagent to 3 mL of urine in a test tube one can see a change of color, to dark pink or red. The degree of color change is proportional to the amount of urobilinogen in the urine sample.

Hydrazine determination
p-Dimethylaminobenzaldehyde reacts with hydrazine to form p-Dimethylaminobenzalazine azo-dye which has a distinct yellow color. It is therefore used for spectrophotometric determination of hydrazine in aqueous solutions at 457 nm.

Isaac Asimov essay

Isaac Asimov, in a 1963 humorous essay entitled "You, too, can speak Gaelic", reprinted in the anthology Adding a Dimension among others, traces the etymology of each component of the chemical name "para-di-methyl-amino-benz-alde-hyde" (e.g. the syllable "-benz-" ultimately derives from the Arabic lubān jāwī (لبان جاوي, "frankincense from Java").  Asimov points out that the name can be pronounced to the tune of the familiar jig "The Irish Washerwoman", and relates an anecdote in which a receptionist of Irish descent, hearing him singing the syllables thus, mistook them for the original Gaelic words to the jig.  This essay inspired Jack Carroll's 1963 filk song "The Chemist's Drinking Song," (NESFA Hymnal Vol. 2 2nd ed. p. 65) set to the tune of that jig, which begins "Paradimethylaminobenzaldehyde, / Sodium citrate, ammonium cyanide, / ..."

See also 
 Paul Ehrlich

References

Urine
Chemical tests
Benzaldehydes
Dimethylamino compounds
Analytical chemistry